La Mitra is a town in the Panamá province of Panama. The town is located southwest of Panama City, off the Carretera Panamericana (Pan-American Highway). in the central part of the country, 30 km southwest of Panama, the capital. 92 meters above sea level is located in La Mitra and has 4,778 inhabitants.

References

Sources 
World Gazeteer: Panama – World-Gazetteer.com

Populated places in Panamá Province